Anaspis nigrina is a species of false flower beetle in the family Scraptiidae. It is found in North America.

References

Further reading

 

Scraptiidae
Articles created by Qbugbot
Beetles described in 1915